Robert Hodorogea (born 24 March 1995) is a Romanian professional footballer who plays as a defender for Politehnica Iași.

Honours

Club
Viitorul Constanța
Liga I: 2016–17

References

External links

1995 births
Living people
Romanian footballers
Association football defenders
Liga I players
Liga II players
Liga III players
FC Viitorul Constanța players
FC Voluntari players
FC Politehnica Iași (2010) players